Group E of the women's soccer tournament at the 1996 Summer Olympics was played from 21 to 25 July 1996, and included hosts United States, China, Denmark and Sweden. The top two teams advanced to the Semi-finals.

All times are EST (UTC−5).

Teams

 (host nation)

Standings

Matches

United States vs Denmark

Sweden vs China PR

Denmark vs China PR

United States vs Sweden

United States vs China PR

Denmark vs Sweden

References

Women's football at the 1996 Summer Olympics